Hotel 13 is a television program produced jointly by Belgian broadcaster Studio 100 and Nickelodeon. The series was filmed in German and then dubbed into other languages, like Dutch, Polish, Russian and Swedish.

Cast

Main

Supporting 

2012 German television series debuts
2014 German television series endings
German television soap operas
2010s teen drama television series
2010s mystery television series
2010s high school television series
German children's television series
German-language television shows
Television series set in hotels